Fairview Township is one of nine townships in Fayette County, Indiana. As of the 2010 census, its population was 347 and it contained 143 housing units.

History
Fairview Township was organized in Dec. 1851 from parts of Harrison and Orange townships.

Geography

Cities and towns
 Glenwood (northeast edge)

Unincorporated towns
 Fairview

Adjacent townships
 Posey Township (north)
 Harrison Township (east)
 Connersville Township (southeast)
 Orange Township (south)
 Union Township, Rush County (west)
 Washington Township, Rush County (northwest)

Major highways
 Indiana State Road 44

References
 
 United States Census Bureau cartographic boundary files

External links
 Indiana Township Association
 United Township Association of Indiana

Townships in Fayette County, Indiana
Townships in Indiana